Posionjärvi is a medium-sized lake in the Koutajoki main catchment area. It is located in Posio municipality, in the region Lapland in Finland.

There are 187 islands in the lake.

See also
List of lakes in Finland

References

Lakes of Posio